Eucharia Anunobi,  (born 27 May 1965) is a Nigerian actress, producer, and pastor. She is best known for her role in the movie Abuja Connection. She was nominated at 2020 Africa Magic Viewers' Choice Awards for Best Supporting Actress in a Movie or TV Series.

Early life and career
Anunobi was born in Owerri, Imo State, and went on to complete her primary and secondary school education there before proceeding to the Institute of Management Technology, Enugu where she graduated with a National Diploma in Mass Communication. She also holds a Bachelor of Arts degree after studying English Language at the University of Nigeria, Nsukka. Anunobi came into the limelight for her role in the movie series Glamour Girls II in 1996 and has gone on to star in over 90 movies including Abuja Connection and Letters to a Stranger. She is currently serving as an evangelist at a church in Egbeda, Lagos State. Anunobi lost The joy only son, Raymond, whom she described as her best friend to complications arising from sickle cell anemia on 22 August 2017. He was aged 15. She is of the view that sex before marriage is important.

Filmography

References

External links

1965 births
Living people
Igbo actresses
21st-century Nigerian actresses
Actresses from Imo State
Nigerian film producers
Institute of Management Technology, Enugu alumni
University of Nigeria alumni
Nigerian Christian clergy
Nigerian Pentecostal pastors